Shalini Arora  (born 9 November 1971) is an Indian actress, known for her roles Paap Shakti Rakshindra in Aryamaan – Brahmaand Ka Yodha and as Ramdulari Devi, the mother of Lal Bahadur Shastri in Jai Jawaan Jai Kisaan (2015) a biopic about the former Prime Minister of India.

Television  
2002 Aryamaan – Brahmaand Ka Yodha as Paap Shakti Rakshindra
2009–11 Pavitra Rishta 
2010–11 Geeta as Manorama Bhagat 
2011–12 Phulwa as Thakurian 
2013 Pavitra Bandhan as Pishimaa
2014 Madhubala – Ek Ishq Ek Junoon as Baiji Kushwaha
2014–15 Balika Vadhu as Suman Kabra
2015 Bhagyalaxmi as Janki
2015 Diya Aur Baati Hum as Yashoda
2016–17 Ek Shringaar-Swabhiman as Asha Rathod
2017 Woh Apna Sa as Sharda Khurana Jindal
2018–present Ishq Subhan Allah as Salma Baig Siddiqui
2019 Nazar as Jaya Rathod Khanna

Movies

Zameen (2003)
Muskkaan (2004)
Jai Jawaan Jai Kisaan (2015) as Ramdulari Devi
Fuddu (2016)

References

Living people
Indian television actresses
1971 births
Indian film actresses
Actresses in Hindi television
Actresses in Hindi cinema